Time of the Butcherbird is the final novel by South African novelist Alex La Guma. The novel was first published in 1979.

References 

Works by Alex La Guma
1979 novels
20th-century South African novels